Stephen Mitchell Grant (born December 23, 1969) is a former American football linebacker for the West Virginia Mountaineers and Indianapolis Colts in the National Football League. As of 2019, Grant is the chaplain for the Texas Tech University football program in Lubbock, Texas.

Professional career
Grant was selected by the Indianapolis Colts in the 1992 NFL Draft. Grant was the Colts' Hard Nose Player of the Year in 1994, when he recorded a fumble recovery. In 1995, Grant started all 16 games of the season and recorded his first career professional interception. Injuries ended Grant's career early in 1997 however, after spending  six seasons in the NFL.

References

External links
Steve Grant's Collegiate Stats

1969 births
Living people
Miami Southridge Senior High School alumni
Players of American football from Miami
American football linebackers
West Virginia Mountaineers football players
Indianapolis Colts players